Garry L. Hagberg is an author, professor, philosopher, and jazz musician, He is currently the James H. Ottaway Jr. Professor of Philosophy and Aesthetics at Bard College.

Career
He received his B.A., M.A. and Ph. D. at the University of Oregon and conducted his postdoctoral research at Cambridge University.

He held a chair in philosophy at the University of East Anglia.

Hagberg became a professor of philosophy at Bard College in 1990. He has been the recipient of many fellowships and grants from Dartmouth College; Cambridge University Library; Institute for the Theory and Criticism of the Visual Arts; British Library, London; St. John's College, and Cambridge University.

At Bard, he teaches specialized courses on the philosophy of the arts and the history of aesthetic thought; the philosophy of language since 1900; pragmatism; and the development of twentieth-century philosophy, in addition to courses on issues and authors from Plato and Aristotle to the present day.

Jazz
Hagberg is an accomplished jazz guitar player. He is a member of the Atlantic Jazz Trio, which tours in Europe and the United States.

Writing
He is editor of the journal Philosophy and Literature, and has contributed to such publications as Historical Reflections, The Henry James Review, Philosophy, The Journal of Aesthetics and Art Criticism, Journal of Aesthetic Education, Mind, New Novel Review, The Philosophical Quarterly, Ethics, Perspectives of New Music, Encyclopedia of the Essay, Encyclopedia of Aesthetics, and Routledge Companion to Aesthetics.

His work totals to roughly fifty articles and thirty-five reviews, review-essays, and art catalogue essays.

Hagberg is the author of three books:
 Describing Ourselves: Wittgenstein and Autobiographical Consciousness,
 Art as Language: Wittgenstein, Meaning, and Aesthetic Theory, and
 Meaning and Interpretation: Wittgenstein, Henry James and Literary Knowledge.

See also
 American philosophy
 List of American philosophers

References

External links
 Stanford Encyclopedia of Philosophy: Garry Hagberg on Wittgenstein's Aeshetics

Bard College faculty
Year of birth missing (living people)
Living people
University of Oregon alumni
Academics of the University of East Anglia
American philosophers
American jazz musicians